Woodside railway station is a rural railway station located in the Wairarapa, 5 km west of and serving Greytown, New Zealand. The Wairarapa Connection serves the station several times daily with services to Wellington and Masterton.

The station building has in recent years been restored by the Woodside Station Preservation Society.

History 
The original survey for the Wairarapa Line, completed in 1876, considered two routes for the line between Featherston and Masterton: the Central route and the Western route.  Despite the protestations of the residents of Greytown, the Western route was chosen due to concerns about the possibility of flooding north of Greytown, which meant that the line bypassed Greytown and passed through Woodside instead.

Woodside opened on 14 May 1880 with the extension of the line from Featherston. Until the line from Woodside to Masterton was completed and opened in November of that year, Woodside was the northern terminus of the Wairarapa Line and was operated by the Public Works Department, initially with two mixed trains between Greytown and Wellington each day.

The amenities at Woodside initially consisted of a station building and stationmaster's house.  The station building was on an island platform between the main line and the Greytown Branch, with the junction at the southern end of the platform.  There was road access from north of the platform.  The branch (eastern) side had two loops, with capacities of 18 and 11 wagons, while on the main line (western) side there were two loops with capacities of 44 and 35 wagons.

Some years after the closure of the Greytown Branch in 1953 the main line yard was removed, and the station building relocated to a new platform on the western side of the main line.  A new crossing loop was installed, and the branch sidings reconfigured.  In 1954 the Greytown station building was relocated to Woodside and modified to serve as a goods shed. It is now disused and the loop and sidings have been removed.

With the opening of the line to Masterton and the reversion of the line to Greytown to branch-line status, Woodside became known as Woodside Junction until the closure of the Greytown Branch in 1953: the platform name board read "Woodside Junction. Change here for Greytown."

A Wairarapa train was struck by a tree branch on 17 September 2019 near the Waiohine Bridge, but the driver continued and stopped at Woodside Station.

Services 
There are five Metlink Wairarapa Connection trains both ways on Monday to Thursday, six on Friday and two each way on Saturday and Sunday.

A shuttle bus service to Greytown, Route 204, connects with trains. It is operated by Tranzit Coachlines for Metlink, and operates Monday to Saturday (it does not operate on Sundays or public holidays).

Gallery

References

External links
 Passenger service timetables from Metlink and Tranz Metro.
 
 Tank locomotive WF 400 on a Greytown train at Woodside, a photo of a Greytown Branch train waiting at Woodside station.
 Woodside - change for Greytown, a photo showing passengers transferring between trains at Woodside station.

Rail transport in Wellington
Public transport in the Wellington Region
Railway stations in New Zealand
Railway stations opened in 1880
Buildings and structures in the Wairarapa
Greytown, New Zealand